Okpik's Dream is a Canadian documentary film, released in 2015. The film centres on Harry Okpik, an Inuk man from Quaqtaq, who witnessed a government slaughter of Inuit sled dogs as a child and later lost his leg in a hunting accident, and now prepares to compete as a dog musher in the 600 km Ivakkak sled dog race in Nunavik.

The film had select film festival screenings, but was distributed primarily as a CBC Television special which aired in August 2015 as an episode of the regional documentary series Absolutely Canadian.

The film won a Community Award from the 2015 First Peoples' Festival in Montreal, and was a nominee for Best Documentary Program at the 4th Canadian Screen Awards.

See also
Qimmit, a Clash of Two Truths, a 2010 documentary about the alleged mass slaughter of Inuit sled dogs

References

External links 
 
 

2015 films
Canadian documentary television films
English-language Canadian films
Inuktitut-language films
Films shot in Quebec
Nunavik
2015 documentary films
Mushing films
Documentary films about sportspeople with disability
Films about amputees
Documentary films about Inuit in Canada
CBC Television original films
Canadian sports documentary films
2010s Canadian films